is the 14th single by Japanese rock band Superfly and the first single released after the band's "Mind Traveller" tour. Both of the song's two tracks are used as theme music for the 2011 film adaptation of the manga Smuggler. The DVD edition of the single features footage of Superfly's live concert at the Yokohama Red Brick Warehouse which was to promote the release of the band's third album Mind Travel. Superfly has stated that "Ai o Kurae" is a return to the band's old style. It ultimately peaked at number 3 on the Oricon Weekly Charts, the highest ranking on the Oricon Singles Chart yet for Superfly (the previous release "Wildflower & Cover Songs: Complete Best 'Track 3'" reached number 1 on the Albums Charts, despite being called a single by the band).

Track listing

References

External links
"Ai o Kurae" at Superfly-Web.com

2011 singles
2011 songs
Japanese film songs
Japanese-language songs
Superfly (band) songs
Warner Music Japan singles

Music articles needing expert attention
Song articles by quality
Japanese music-related lists